Lü Lin (born April 6, 1969 in Wenling) is a Chinese table tennis player and Olympic champion. He uses a pen-grip topspin style, and is best known for the combination of him and Wang Tao in men's doubles championships.

He won a gold medal in men's doubles at the 1992 Summer Olympics in Barcelona with Wang Tao.

They took part in the 1996 Summer Olympics in Atlanta again, where they won a silver medal.

The combo also won the men's doubles title at 1993 and 1995 World Table Tennis Championships.

Lü Lin's son, Lü Xiang (born 1996), is also a table tennis player. He won the Men's Doubles title at the 2014 German Open.

References

External links

1969 births
Living people
Chinese male table tennis players
Olympic table tennis players of China
Table tennis players at the 1992 Summer Olympics
Table tennis players at the 1996 Summer Olympics
Olympic gold medalists for China
Olympic silver medalists for China
Olympic medalists in table tennis
Asian Games medalists in table tennis
Table tennis players from Zhejiang
People from Taizhou, Zhejiang
Table tennis players at the 1994 Asian Games
Medalists at the 1996 Summer Olympics
Medalists at the 1992 Summer Olympics
Asian Games gold medalists for China
Asian Games bronze medalists for China
Medalists at the 1994 Asian Games